Dorina Ágnes Lepp is a Hungarian model and beauty pageant titleholder who was crowned as Magyarország Szépe 2015 First Runner Up and Hungary's representative in Miss Earth 2015. The pageant was won by Daniella Kiss of Bag.

Pageantry

Magyarország Szépe 2015
Dorina Ágnes Lepp who was adjudged the first runner-up in the finals of Magyarország Szépe 2015 (Miss World Hungary 2015) pageant held on 21 June 2015.

The delegates competed through different layers of Preliminary competition at the finale of Miss World Hungary 2015. Dorina Agnes, excelled in all the three rounds, including Bikini Round with a retro vibe, evening gown round, and Swimsuit round. At the same event, Daniella Kiss was crowned as the winner of Miss World Hungary 2015 by the outgoing queen Edina Kulcsar. She will represent Hungary at the Miss World 2015 pageant and Virag Steingruber was adjudged the second runner-up.

Miss Earth 2015
Dorina competed at Miss Earth 2015 and placed Top 16.

References

Miss Earth 2015 contestants
Hungarian beauty pageant winners
Living people
Models from Budapest
1993 births